Gelaz (also Romanized as Gelāz; also known as Kelāz) is a village in Dasht-e Bil Rural District, in the Central District of Oshnavieh County, West Azerbaijan Province, Iran. At the 2006 census, its population was 935, in 207 families.

References 

Populated places in Oshnavieh County